Giuseppe Felice Romani (31 January 178828 January 1865) was an Italian poet and scholar of literature and mythology who wrote many librettos for the opera composers Donizetti and Bellini. Romani was considered the finest Italian librettist between Metastasio and Boito.

Biography
Born Giuseppe Felice Romani to a bourgeois family in Genoa, he studied law and literature in Pisa and Genoa. At the University of Genoa he translated French literature and, with a colleague, prepared a six-volume dictionary of mythology and antiquities, including the history of the Celts in Italy. Romani's expertise in French and antiquity is reflected in the libretti he wrote; the majority are based on French literature and many, such as Norma, use mythological sources.

After refusing a post at the University of Genoa, he appears to have travelled to France, Spain, Greece and Germany before returning to Milan in either 1812 or 1813. There he became friends with important figures in the literary and musical world. He turned down the post of court poet in Vienna, and began instead a career as opera librettist. He wrote two librettos for the composer Simon Mayr, which resulted in his appointment as the librettist for La Scala. Romani became the most highly regarded of all Italian librettists of his age, producing nearly one hundred. In spite of his interest in French literature, he refused to work in Paris.

Romani wrote the librettos for Bellini's Il pirata, La straniera, Zaira, I Capuleti e i Montecchi, La sonnambula, Norma and Beatrice di Tenda, for Rossini's Il turco in Italia and Bianca e Falliero, and Donizetti's Anna Bolena and L'elisir d'amore (which he adapted from Eugène Scribe's Le philtre). He also wrote a libretto (originally for composer Adalbert Gyrowetz) that Verdi used for his early comedy Un giorno di regno.

Romani was considered an ideal match for Bellini, who is quoted as having said: "Give me good verses and I will give you good music". Dramatic, even extravagant "situations" expressed in verses "designed to portray the passions in the liveliest manner" was what Bellini was looking for in a libretto, according to a letter to Francesco Florimo, of 4 August 1834, and he found them in Romani.

The two, however, had a falling out over missed deadlines for Beatrice di Tenda. After setting I puritani to a libretto by Carlo Pepoli, Bellini was determined not to compose any more Italian operas with anyone but Romani. I puritani was his last opera; he died less than a year after its première. Romani mourned him deeply and wrote an obituary in which he expressed his profound regrets over their disagreement.

In 1834 Romani became editor of the Gazzetta Ufficiale Piemontese to which he contributed literary criticism. He retained the post, with a break 1849–1854, until his death, in Moneglia, (in the region of Liguria, Italy). A volume of his lyric poems was published in 1841.

Libretti
For each libretto the composer/s are listed who set it to music, the date of the first performance, and the new title where applicable.

 La rosa bianca e la rosa rossa
 Simon Mayr (1813)
 Pietro Generali (1818)
 Tomás Genovés y Lapetra, Enrico e Clotilde (1831)
 Medea in Corinto
 Simon Mayr (1813)
 Prospero Selli (1839)
 Saverio Mercadante, Medea, revision by Salvadore Cammarano (1851)
 Aureliano in Palmira
 Gioachino Rossini (1813)
 Atar ossia Il serraglio di Ormus
 Simon Mayr (1814)
 Carlo Coccia, Atar ou O serralho de Ormuz (1820)
 Luiz Antonio Miró, Atar ou O serralho d'Ormus (1836)
 Il turco in Italia
 Gioachino Rossini (1814)
 Le due duchesse subtitled La caccia ai lupi
 Simon Mayr (1814)
 Filippo Celli (1824)
 L'ira di Achille
 Giuseppe Nicolini (1814)
 La testa di bronzo or La capanna solitaria
 Carlo Evasio Soliva (1816)
 Saverio Mercadante (1827)
 Giacomo Fontemaggi (1835)
 Vincenzo Mela (1855)
 Maometto
 Peter Winter (1817)
 Rodrigo di Valenza
 Pietro Generali (1817)
 Ferdinando Orlandi (1820)
 Filippo Chimeri, Elmonda di Valenza (1845)
 Mennone e Zemira
 Simon Mayr (1817)
 La gioventù di Cesare
 Stefano Pavesi (1814)
 Le zingare dell'Asturia
 Carlo Evasio Soliva (1817)
 Adele di Lusignano
 Michele Carafa (1817)
 Ramón Carnicer (1819)
 I due Valdomiri
 Peter Winter (1817)
 Gianni di Parigi
 Francesco Morlacchi (1818)
 Giovanni Antonio Speranza (1836)
 Gaetano Donizetti (set to music 1831, first performance 1839)
 Il finto Stanislao
 Adalbert Gyrowetz (1818)
 Giuseppe Verdi, Un giorno di regno (1840)
 Il barone di Dolshein
 Giovanni Pacini (1818)
 Franz Schoberlechner (1827)
 Danao
 Simon Mayr (1818)
 Giuseppe Persiani, Danao re d'Argo (1827)
 Gl'Illinesi
 Francesco Basili (1819)
 Francesco Sampieri (1823)
 Luigi Viviani, L'eroe francese (1826)
 Feliciano Strepponi (1829)
 Pietro Antonio Coppola, Gli Illinesi (1835)
 Francisco Gomez, Irza (1845)
 Clemenza d'Entragues
 Vittorio Trento (1819)
 Il falegname di Livonia
 Giovanni Pacini (1819)
 Il califo e la schiava
 Francesco Basili (1819)
 Gioachino Rossini, Adina, revision by Gherardo Bevilacqua Aldobrandini (1826)
 Giovanni Quaquerini (1842)
 Bianca e Falliero or Il consiglio dei tre
 Gioachino Rossini (1819)
 Vallace or L'eroe scozzese
 Giovanni Pacini (1820)
 La sacerdotessa d'Irminsul
 Giovanni Pacini (1820)
 I due Figaro or Il soggetto di una commedia
 Michele Carafa (1820)
 Giovanni Panizza (1824)
 Dionigi Brogialdi (1825)
 Saverio Mercadante (composed: 1826/staged: 1835)
 Giovanni Antonio Speranza (1839)
 Margherita d'Anjou
 Giacomo Meyerbeer (1820)
 Donna Aurora or Il romanzo all'improvviso
 Francesco Morlacchi (1821)
 La voce misteriosa
 Giuseppe Mosca (1821)
 Carlo Mellara (1823)
 Atalia
 Simon Mayr (1822)
 L'esule di Granata
 Giacomo Meyerbeer (1822)
 Giovanni Tadolini, Almanzor (1827)
 Adele ed Emerico ossia Il posto abbandonato
 Saverio Mercadante (1822; revised 1826)
 Chiara e Serafina subtitled Il pirata
 Gaetano Donizetti (1822)
 Alberto Mazzucato, I corsari, revision by Temistocle Solera (1840)
 Amleto
 Saverio Mercadante (1822)
 Chi fa così, fa bene
 Feliciano Strepponi (1823)
 Abufar, ossia La famiglia araba
 Michele Carafa (1823)
 Manuel García, El Abufar (1827)
 Francesca da Rimini
 Feliciano Strepponi (1823)
 Luigi Carlini (1825)
 Massimiliano Quilici (1829)
 Saverio Mercadante (written 1830; unperformed)
 Giuseppe Staffa (1831)
 Giuseppe Fournier (1832)
 Giuseppe Tamburini (1835)
 Emanuele Borgatta (1837)
 Francesco Morlacchi (composta nel 1840, incompiuta)
 Francesco Canneti (1843)
 Giovanni Franchini (1857)
 Egilda di Provenza
 Stefano Pavesi (1823)
 João Evangelista Pereira da Costa, Egilda de Provenca (1827)
 Amina or L'innocenza perseguitata
 Giuseppe Rastrelli (1824)
 Antonio D'Antoni (1825)
 Carlo Valentini, Amina, subtitled L'orfanella di Ginevra, revision by Andrea Leone Tottola (1825)
 Elena e Malvina
 Carlo Evasio Soliva (1824)
 Ramón Carnicer, Elena e Malvina (1829)
 Francesco Vincenzo Schira (1832)
 Giuseppe Mazza (1834)
 Egisto Vignozzi (1835)
 Il sonnambulo
 Michele Carafa (1824)
 Luigi Ricci (1830)
 Carlo Valentini (1834)
 Luiz Antonio Miró, O sonambulo (1835)
 Salvatore Agnelli, Il fantasma (1842)
 Giuseppe Persiani, Il fantasma (1843)
 Gli avventurieri
 Giacomo Cordella (1825)
 Luigi Felice Rossi (1835)
 Carlo Valentini (1836)
 Antonio Buzzolla (1842)
 Antonio Cagnoni, Amori e trappole, revision by Marco Marcelliano Marcello (1850)
 Giulietta e Romeo
 Nicola Vaccai (1825)
 Eugenio Torriani (1828)
 Vincenzo Bellini, I Capuleti e i Montecchi (1830)
 Il montanaro
 Saverio Mercadante (1827)
 Pietro Campiuti, L'incognito (1832)
 Giovan Battista Cagnola, Il podestà di Gorgonzola (1854)
 La selva d'Hermanstadt
 Felice Frasi (1827)
 Il pirata
 Vincenzo Bellini (1827)
 Gastone di Foix
 Giuseppe Persiani (1827)
 Franciszek Mirecki, Cornelio Bentivoglio (1844)
 Il divorzio Persiano subtitled Il gran bazzarro di Bassora
 Pietro Generali (1828)
 Feliciano Strepponi, L'ullà di Bassora (1831)
 Giuseppe Gerli, Il pitocco (1834)
 Giuseppe Mazza (1836)
 I saraceni in Sicilia ovvero Eufemio di Messina
 Francesco Morlacchi (1828)
 Daniele Nicelli, Il proscritto di Messina (1829)
 Giuseppe Persiani, Eufemio di Messina ovvero La distruzione di Catania (1829)
 Francesco Morlacchi, Il rinnegato (1832)
 Ramón Carnicer, Eufemio da Messina o Los sarracenos en Sicilia (1832)
 Alessandro Curmi, Il proscritto di Messina (1843)
 Angelo Agostini, Il rinnegato (1858)
 Alina, regina di Golconda
 Gaetano Donizetti (1828)
 Colombo
 Francesco Morlacchi (1828)
 Luigi Ricci (1829)
 Ramón Carnicer, Cristoforo Colombo (1831)
 Luigi Bottesini, Cristoforo Colombo (1848)
 Carlo Emanuele De Barbieri, Columbus (1848)
 Vincenzo Mela, Cristoforo Colombo (1857)
 Felicita Casella, Cristoforo Colombo (1865)
 Giuseppe Marcora (1869)
 La straniera
 Vincenzo Bellini (1829)
 Rosmonda
 Carlo Coccia (1829)
 Gaetano Donizetti, Rosmonda d'Inghilterra (1834)
 Antonio Belisario (1835)
 Pietro Tonassi e Pietro Collavo, Il castello di Woodstock (1839)
 Otto Nicolai, Enrico II (1839)
 Saul
 Nicola Vaccai (1829)
 Ferdinando Ceccherini (1843)
 Giovanni Antonio Speranza (1844)
 Zaira
 Vincenzo Bellini (1829)
 Alessandro Gandini (1829)
 Saverio Mercadante (1831)
 Antonio Mami (1845)
 Giovanna Shore
 Carlo Conti (1829)
 Lauro Rossi (1836)
 Enrico Lacroix (1845)
 Vincenzo Bonnetti (1853)
 La rappresaglia
 Saverio Mercadante (1829)
 Bianca di Belmonte
 Luigi Riesck (1829)
 Tomás Genovés y Lapetra (1833)
 Annibale in Torino
 Luigi Ricci (1830)
 Anna Bolena
 Gaetano Donizetti (1830)
 Il romito di Provenza
 Pietro Generali (1831)
 M. A. Sauli (1846)
 La sonnambula
 Vincenzo Bellini (1831)
 Il disertore svizzero aka La nostalgia Cesare Pugni (1831)
 Lauro Rossi (1832)
 Angelo Pellegrini (1841)
 Giovanni Battista Meiners (1842)
 La neve Luigi Ricci (1831)
 Norma Vincenzo Bellini (1831)
 I normanni a Parigi Saverio Mercadante (1832)
 Ugo, Conte di Parigi Gaetano Donizetti (1832)
 Alberto Mazzucato (1843)
 L'elisir d'amore Gaetano Donizetti (1832)
 Ismalia ossia Morte ed amore Saverio Mercadante (1832)
 Ramón Carnicer (1838)
 Vicenc Cuyás y Borés, La fattucchiera (1838)
 Il segreto Luigi Maiocchi (1833)
 Placido Mandanici (1836)
 Caterina di Guisa Carlo Coccia (1833)
 Giuseppe Mazza (1836)
 Luigi Savi (1838)
 Fabio Campana (1838)
 Francesco Chiaromonte (1850)
 Antonio Gandolfi (1859)
 Cenobio Paniagua y Vasques (1859)
 Beniamino Rossi (1861)
 Giacomo Nascimbene, Enrico di Guisa (1868)
 Il conte d'Essex Saverio Mercadante (1833)
 Parisina Gaetano Donizetti (1833)
 Tomás E. Giribaldi (1878)
 Beatrice di Tenda Vincenzo Bellini (1833)
 Rinaldo Ticci (1837)
 Frederico Guimarães, Beatriz (1882)
 Il contrabbandiere Cesare Pugni (1833)
 Natale Perelli (1842)
 I due sergenti Luigi Ricci (1833)
 Alberto Mazzucato (1841)
 Gualtiero Sanelli (1842)
 Lucrezia Borgia Gaetano Donizetti (1833)
 La figlia dell'arciere Carlo Coccia, atto III di Domenico Andreotti (1834)
 Gaetano Donizetti, Adelia, Third Act by Girolamo Maria Marini (1841)
 Carlo Pedrotti (1844)
 Valdemaro de Barbarikine, Adelia (1877)
 Un'avventura di Scaramuccia Luigi Ricci (1834)
 Emma d'Antiochia Saverio Mercadante (1834)
 Giovanni Bracciolini, Emma e Ruggero (1838)
 Vincenzo Pontani, Emma e Ruggero (1852)
 Carlo Lovati-Cozzulani, Alda (1866)
 Ercole Cavazza, Emma (1877)
 Un episodio del San Michele Cesare Pugni (1834)
 Giuseppe Concone (1836)
 Luigi Savi, L'avaro (1840)
 Ermanno Picchi, Il tre di novembre (1844)
 Giuseppe Lombardini, La sartina e l'usurajo (1853)
 Pietro Repetto, Un episodio del San Michele (1855)
 Guglielmo Quarenghi, Il dì di San Michele (1863)
 Carlo Brizzi, L'avaro (1877)
 Uggero il danese Saverio Mercadante (1834)
 La gioventù di Enrico V Saverio Mercadante (1834)
 Francesca Donato subtitled Corinto distrutta Saverio Mercadante (1835)
 Pietro Raimondi (1842)
 Odio e amore Mariano Obiols (1837)
 Alfonso Cosentino, Laurina (1858)
 La solitaria delle Asturie or La Spagna ricuperata Carlo Coccia (1838)
 Saverio Mercadante (1840)
 Luigi Ricci (1845)
 Giuseppe Sordelli (1846)
 Giuseppe Winter, Matilde di Scozia (1852)
 La spia ovvero Il merciaiuolo americano Angelo Villanis (1850)
 Edita di Lorno Giulio Litta (1853)
 Cristina di Svezia''
 Sigismond Thalberg (1855)

References

1788 births
1865 deaths
Writers from Genoa
Italian opera librettists
Italian translators
University of Genoa alumni
Translators from French
Translators to Italian
19th-century Italian poets
Italian male poets
Italian male dramatists and playwrights
19th-century Italian dramatists and playwrights
19th-century Italian male writers
19th-century Italian translators